Léon Strauss (born August 14, 1927, in Sarrebourg, France) is a French historian and academic, specializing in nineteenth and twentieth century history of Alsace. He studied the history of trade unionism and the labor movement, and the history of the Left in Alsace. Strauss is Honorary Lecturer at the University of Strasbourg.

Bibliography 
 

1927 births
20th-century French historians
Living people